Princess Miriam al-Ghazi (born Miriam Ungría y López; born 2 September 1963), known during her first marriage as The Princess of Tarnovo, is a Spanish gemologist and jewellery designer. She served as the Director of Fine Jewellery for the Spanish brand Carrera y Carrera, later forming her own brand, MdeU, in 2014. Through her first marriage to Kardam, Prince of Tarnovo, the eldest son and heir of Simeon II of Bulgaria, she became a member of the Bulgarian royal family. After her husband's death in 2015, her son Prince Boris became the heir apparent to the defunct Bulgarian throne. In September 2022, she married  Prince Ghazi bin Muhammad, a first cousin of Abdullah II of Jordan, becoming a member of the Jordanian royal family.

Early life 
Miriam was born Miriam Ungría y López on 2 September 1963 in Madrid to Bernardo Ungría y Goiburu and María del Carmen López y Oleaga. She is of Basque descent.

Career 
Miriam has a degree in history and geography, with a concentration in art history, from the Complutense University of Madrid. She later studied gemology, jewellery manufacturing, wax molding, gemstone setting and jewellery design at the University of Oviedo's European Centre of Gemology and Jewellery.

In 1991 she launched her first jewellery collection and founded the Spanish Jewellery Appraiser's Association, serving as the association's president.

In 2000 she joined Carrera y Carrera as the brand's director of fine jewellery. She launched the Garden of Roses collection in New York in July 2002.

In 2014 she launched own jewellery line, MdeU. Her collection, including rings, pendants, bracelets and earrings, is sold at El Corte Inglés. In 2017, with support from members of the Jordanian royal family, she opened an exhibition of jewels and MdeU pieces at the Jordan National Gallery of Fine Arts.

In February 2017 Miriam presented her jewellery design collections in Bulgaria for the first time, with a three-day exhibit titled Miriam de Ungria: Exquisite Touch at the Radisson Blu Hotel.

Personal life 
On 11 July 1996 she married Kardam, Prince of Tarnovo, the eldest son of Simeon II of Bulgaria and Doña Margarita Gómez-Acebo y Cejuela and heir to the defunct throne of Bulgaria, in an Eastern Orthodox ceremony at St. Andrey and St. Dimitar Orthodox Church in Madrid. Her wedding dress is on display in an exhibit in the Museo del Traje. Upon their marriage, Miriam was titled as Princess of Tarnovo and Duchess in Saxony. They have two sons, Prince Boris and Prince Beltrán.

On 15 August 2008 Miriam and her husband were involved in a serious car accident in El Molar. Miriam was taken to the Hospital Universitario La Paz to be treated for her injuries. Her husband sustained a serious brain injury. Miriam's husband died in 2015.

She lives in South Kensington, London.

On 3 September 2022, Miriam married Prince Ghazi bin Muhammad, a first cousin of King Abdullah II of Jordan, at Raghadan Palace.

Honours 
  Portuguese Royal Family:
 Dame Grand Cross of the Royal Order of Saint Isabel

References 

1963 births
Living people
Jordanian princesses
House of Hashim
Dames of the Order of Saint Isabel
Bulgarian princesses
Princesses of Saxe-Coburg and Gotha
German duchesses
Princesses by marriage
House of Saxe-Coburg and Gotha (Bulgaria)
20th-century Spanish nobility
20th-century Spanish women
21st-century Spanish women
20th-century Spanish historians
21st-century Spanish historians
Spanish women historians
Spanish people of Basque descent
Gemologists
Jewellery designers
Complutense University of Madrid alumni
University of Oviedo alumni